Klanta Aparahna(1985) (English Tired Afternoon) is a contemporary Oriya film directed by Manmohan Mahapatra, story of everyday life in a small village in Orissa.

Cast
 Kanak Panigrahi – Neeru
 Sachidananda Rath
 Kishori Devi – Neeru's Grand mother
 Madhukar Goshthi
 Master Sushil

Participation
Feminist film festival in Mumbai.

References

External links
 
 Review of 'Klanta Aparahna' in ftvdb.bfi.org.uk
 Casting & Crew of 'Klanta Aparahna' in ccat.sas.upenn.edu
 Story of Klanta Aparahna

1985 films
1980s Odia-language films